Acicula hausdorfi is a species of very small land snail with an operculum. It is a terrestrial gastropod mollusk in the family Aciculidae.

Distribution
This species is endemic to Greece.

References

External links 
 

Acicula (gastropod)
Gastropods described in 1989
Gastropods of Europe
Endemic fauna of Greece
Taxonomy articles created by Polbot
Near threatened biota of Europe